Mir Mahalleh (also Romanized as Mīr Maḩalleh) is a village in Jirdeh Rural District, in the Central District of Shaft County, Gilan Province, Iran. At the 2006 census, its population was 204, in 57 families.

References 

Populated places in Shaft County